The Cathedral Mansions Apartment Buildings are historic structures located at 2900, 3000, and 3100 Connecticut Avenue NW in the Woodley Park neighborhood of Washington, D.C.  Constructed from 1922 to 1924, architect Eugene Waggaman designed the Connecticut Avenue apartment buildings in the Classical Revival style for developer Harry Wardman.  Architect Mihran Mesrobian's initials appear on a drawing for one of the buildings.

The buildings were added to the District of Columbia Inventory of Historic Sites on May 17, 1989, and listed on the National Register of Historic Places on September 9, 1994.

See also
 National Register of Historic Places listings in Washington, D.C.

References

External links
 

Apartment buildings in Washington, D.C.
District of Columbia Inventory of Historic Sites
Neoclassical architecture in Washington, D.C.
Residential buildings completed in 1925
Residential buildings on the National Register of Historic Places in Washington, D.C.